

Diary of the season
In the 2013–14 season of competitive football (soccer) in Cape Verde:
Around October 14 - FC Ultramarina won their recent cup title for São Nicolau
November: Emanuel de Pina (Loco) or (Ney Loko) became coach for Sporting Brava
November 15 - the 2013–14 Santiago Island South Zone begins
November 16 - Paulense celebrated its 32nd anniversary
November 17 - Desportivo da Praia took the spot for Santiago South for six rounds
November 23 - the 2013–14 Fogo Island League begins
December 7 - the 2013–14 São Vicente Island League begins
December 8 - FC Derby took the lead for a week for São Vicente
December 14:
The 2013–14 Brava Island League begins
The 2013–14 Santo Antão Island League (South) begins
The 2013–14 São Nicolau Island League begins
Mindelense defeated Castilho 0-6 in the São Vicente Premier Division and took the number one spot for 12 rounds
December 15 - the 2013–14 Maio Island League begins
December 21:
The 2013–14 Boa Vista Island League begins
The 2013–14 Santo Antão Island League (North) begins
January 13: Sporting Clube da Praia took the number one spot for Santiago South for the remainder of the season
January 18 - the 2013–14 Sal Island League begins
February 15: The group and calendar schedule for the 2014 National Football Championships was sorted in Praia by the Cape Verdean Football Federation
March 9 - Académica da Calheta finished with 21 points and won their third and recent title for Maio and qualified into the national championships.
March 23:
Académica do Porto Novo finished with 34 points and won their eight title for Santo Antão South Zone and qualified into the national championships
SC Atlético finished with 36 points and won their fourth title for São Nicolau and qualified into the national championships
Sporting Clube da Brava finished with 32 points and won their first title for Brava and qualified into the national championships for the first time
March 29 - Sport Clube Verdun finished with 20 points and won their second title for Sal and qualified into the national championships for the first time in more than thirty years
March 30:
Académica Operária finished with 34 points and won their 18th title for Boa Vista and qualified into the national champions
Académica do Fogo finished with 42 points and won their 13th and recent title for Fogo and qualified into the national championships
FC Derby finished with 32 points and won their ninth and recent title for São Vicente and qualified into the national championships, Mindelense, champion of the previous national season also qualified
Grémio Nhágar won their only regional title for Santiago North Zone  and qualified for the first time into the national championships
Paulense finished with 22 points and won their 6th title for Santo Antão North Zone
Sporting Clube da Praia finished with 44 points and won their 8th and recent title for Santiago South Zone
All qualifications into the National Championships listed
April 5 - National Championships begins
April 6 - Mindelense defeated Sal Rei's Acádemica Operária 4-0 and made it the highest scoring match up to the last round
May: FC Ultramarina won the São Nicolau Cup for the season
May 4
Académica Porto Novo defeated Sporting Brava 5-0 and made it the highest scoring match
Regular season ends, Académica do Fogo, Académica do Porto Novo, Mindelense and Sporting Praia advanced into the semis 
May 10 - The Semi-finals started
May 17 - Académica do Fogo and CS Mindelense advanced into the finals
May 24 - The Finals began
May 31 - CS Mindelense claimed their 10th national title, the club qualified into the 2015 Cape Verdean Football Championships the following year.
Early Summer - Tarrafal FC de Monte Trigo was formed, it would participate in the Southern Santo Antão Regional Championships
July 5 - Boavista Praia celebrated its 75th anniversary, the same date as Independence Day in Cape Verde, it would feature friendly matches with other Cape Verdean clubs in the following season
August 13 - Spartak d'Aguadinha was coached for a season by Joel de Castro, the club's first and only Portuguese coach

Final standings

Cape Verdean Football Championships

The first two Group A teams had 7 goals.  Académica do Fogo scored the most with 10 goals in the season and had three wins.  Mindelense had nine and had four wins and qualified into the semis.  Académica do Porto Novo and Sporting Praia lost in the semis, the first without goals and the second with a total of two scored.  In the finals, Mindelense defeated Académica Fogo 2-1 in the first leg, the second leg was scoreless and Mindelense claimed their tenth national title and its national title totals superseded Sporting Praia.

Group A

Group B

Final Stages

Leading goalscorer: Sidney (CS Mindelense) - goals

Island or regional competitions

Regional Championships

Regional Cups

Regional Super Cups
The 2013 champion winner played with a 2013 cup winner (when a club won both, a second place club competed).

Regional Opening Tournaments

Transfer deals

Summer-Fall transfer window
The September/October transfer window runs from the end of the previous season in September up to October.
 Patrick Andrade (or Patrick) from Benfica da Praia to G.D. Ribeirão (outside Cape Verde)
 Ká Semedo from Sporting Praia to  Vitória Guimaraes B

See also
2013 in Cape Verde
2014 in Cape Verde
Timeline of Cape Verdean football

References

 
2013 in association football
 
2014 in association football